Darzikola-ye Akhundi-ye Pain (also Romanized as 'Darzīkolā-ye Ākhūndī-ye Pā’īn; also known as Darzīkolā-ye Ākhūndī) is a village in Gatab-e Shomali Rural District, Gatab District, Babol County, Mazandaran Province, Iran. At the 2006 census, its population was 1,912, in 503 families.

References 

Populated places in Babol County